.desi is a  top-level domain (TLD) used in the Domain Name System of the Internet. It is operated by Desi Networks LLC.
The domain name was originally applied for by  Afilias Inc. and Desi Networks LLC, but the latter won the auctions, though the original amount is private.

The stated purpose of the domain is to promote domain name owners. The word "desi" is derived from Sanskrit deśīya and means "one from our country". The domain refers to websites of Desis in India, Pakistan, and Bangladesh and their diasporas around the world.

References

External links
IANA .desi WHOIS info
.desi Registry Homepage
Free Domain Suggestion Tool
world first WordPress .desi extension blog 
world first .desi domain 

Top-level domains
Computer-related introductions in 2014